Michael Adeyinka Adedeji (born 24 March 1985, in Lagos) is a Nigerian international footballer. He currently plays for Shooting Stars F.C. 
In 2010, he went on loan to Pyunik F.C. in Yerevan and played in the 2010 Champions League qualifiers against the Serbian champions FK Partizan Belgrade. Presently, Adedeji is an important player in the Shooting Stars F.C. having a great season but only as a loan player.

International career 
Adedeji was on the 2005 FIFA World Youth Championship runners-up. He also played for the Nigerian B team in the 2011 WAFU Nations Cup.

References 

1985 births
Yoruba sportspeople
Living people
Sportspeople from Lagos
Nigerian footballers
Nigerian expatriate footballers
Pepsi Football Academy players
Expatriate footballers in Sweden
Sunshine Stars F.C. players
Shooting Stars S.C. players
FC Pyunik players
Nigerian expatriate sportspeople in Sweden
Expatriate footballers in Armenia
Armenian Premier League players
GIF Sundsvall players
Allsvenskan players
Sharks F.C. players
Nigeria under-20 international footballers
Association football fullbacks